Most railways in Europe use the standard gauge of . Some countries use broad gauge, of which there are three types. Narrow gauges are also in use.

Broad gauge 
Russian gauge
: former Soviet Union states
: Finland
(The difference is within tolerance limits, so it is possible to exchange trains between 1520 mm and 1524 mm networks without changes to the wheelsets.)
Irish gauge
: Republic of Ireland and Northern Ireland
Iberian gauge
: Portugal and Spain

Narrow gauge

High-speed rail
Apart from Russia and Finland, all high-speed rail in Europe uses standard-gauge tracks.

See also 

 Rail gauge in North America
 Rail gauge in South America
 Rail gauge in Australia

References

Rail transport in Europe